The Luxe Rodeo Drive Hotel was a luxury hotel in the City of Beverly Hills, California. It was the only hotel located on Rodeo Drive, the main shopping street in Beverly Hills. It closed in 2020.

Location
The hotel building is located at 360 North Rodeo Drive, the main street of the City of Beverly Hills, between Brighton Way and Dayton Way.

History
The Beverly Rodeo Hotel opened in 1962. It was designed by noted mid-century modern architect William Krisel and owned by Seymour Owens & Herb Kronish. Its Cafe Rodeo quickly became one of the most popular and glamorous restaurants in the city. The hotel was part of Hyatt Hotels for a time in the late 1960s and early 1970s and was known as the Beverly Rodeo Hyatt House. In February 1995, Shinko Hotels, a Japanese company, sold the Beverly Rodeo Hotel to Summit Management Group, run by Australian-born businessman Efrem Harkham, who renamed it the Summit Hotel Rodeo Drive. Harkham completely remodeled the property in 2000 at a cost of $15, renaming it the Luxe Rodeo Drive Hotel, part of Luxe Hotels, a chain of three hotels in Los Angeles County. The 2000 renovation moved the famed Cafe Rodeo from its original location directly on Rodeo Drive to deeper inside the hotel, allowing the original space to be leased as luxury shops.

The hotel had 88 rooms, designed by Vicente Wolf, a Cuban-born interior designer from New York City. The hotel was also home to a restaurant called On Rodeo Bistro & Lounge. The chef is David Padilla.

The hotel hosted many philanthropic events,  including the annual Apple Ball for the Beverly Hills Education Foundation. The hotel partnered with the Guittard Chocolate Company to create a cake in the shape of the Beverly Hills City Hall for the centennial block party, which took place on April 27, 2014.

On December 1, 2014, Beverly Hills Police Department officers fired gunshots in the hotel lobby at a suspect shortly after a robbery at the Bank of America branch on Beverly Drive. As a result, traffic on Rodeo Drive was shut down for the rest of the day.

The hotel was home to a monthly art exhibit starting in March 2015. The first exhibit featured Karen Lee Fisher, an artist from Beverly Hills.

The hotel permanently closed in September 2020, due to the economic impact of the COVID-19 pandemic.

Awards
The hotel was the recipient of the Beverly Hills 2013 Golden Palm for community service. A year later, it was the recipient of an AAA Four-Diamond rating.

References

Hotels in Beverly Hills, California
Defunct hotels in California
Hotels established in 1962
Hotel buildings completed in 1962
1962 establishments in California
Hotels disestablished in 2020
2020 disestablishments in California